The River Arrow is a river in the Welsh Marches, rising in Powys in Wales, then flowing into the English county of Herefordshire.

It rises near Gwaunceste Hill, then flows south-east through Newchuch and Michaelchurch-on-Arrow.  It forms a short section of the England/Wales boundary, before flowing into Herefordshire, and through the town of Kington.  It proceeds east through Herefordshire, passing Lyonshall, Staunton-on-Arrow, Pembridge, Eardisland, Arrow Green, Monkland, Ivington, Broadward, and has its confluence with the River Lugg south of Leominster, at Stoke Prior.

Its tributaries include the Gilwern Brook. Others are the Honey Lake Brook, which passes through Ivington Green and Back Brook which joins the Arrow at The Meetings in Kington.

See also
River Arrow, Worcestershire
Rivers of the United Kingdom

External links

Notes from a talk, 'The Historical Development of the Arrow Valley'

Arrow
Arrow
2Arrow
Kington, Herefordshire